Elitsa and Stoyan are a Bulgarian music duo. In 2007, Elitsa Todorova and Stoyan Yankoulov were the entry for Bulgaria at the Eurovision Song Contest 2007. Their 5th place with the song "Water", was the highest Bulgaria had placed until the Eurovision Song Contest 2016.  In March 2013 the duo were selected to represent Bulgaria for a second time at the Eurovision Song Contest 2013, in Malmö, Sweden. They performed in the second semi-final on 16 May 2013 with the song "Samo Shampioni", but did not qualify for the final.

Career 
Elitsa and Stoyan met in 2003. In 2007 they won Pesen Na Eurovizija 2007 and represented Bulgaria at the Eurovision Song Contest 2007, with the song "Voda (Water)". Later they released their second single "Earth".

On 10 February 2013, Elitsa and Stoyan were selected by the Bulgarian National Television (BNT) to represent Bulgaria in the Eurovision Song Contest 2013.  The Bulgarian national selection took place on 3 March 2013, with two songs tied for first place after the combined jury and audience votes, "Kismet" and "Samo Shampioni". Kismet was selected as the winning song, however on 11 March 2013, BNT withdrew "Kismet" due to copyright concerns and replaced it with "Samo shampioni".

References

Bulgarian musical groups
Eurovision Song Contest entrants for Bulgaria
Eurovision Song Contest entrants of 2007
Eurovision Song Contest entrants of 2013
Male–female musical duos